Jay Eck (born 24 December 1950) is an American college basketball coach, last as an assistant coach at Towson University. He has previously served as head coach at the University of Toledo.

References

1950 births
Living people
American men's basketball coaches
American men's basketball players
Basketball coaches from Wisconsin
Basketball players from Wisconsin
Bradley Braves men's basketball coaches
College men's basketball head coaches in the United States
Loyola Ramblers men's basketball coaches
Pittsburgh Panthers men's basketball coaches
Sportspeople from Madison, Wisconsin
Toledo Rockets men's basketball coaches
Towson Tigers men's basketball coaches
Xavier Musketeers men's basketball players
Wisconsin–Stevens Point Pointers men's basketball coaches